Phreodrilidae is a family of annelids belonging to the order Haplotaxida.

Genera

Genera:
 Antarctodrilus Brinkhurst, 1965
 Astacopsidrilus Goddard, 1909

References

Haplotaxida